Agostino Maccari was a 17th-century Italian astrologer, theologian, protonotary apostolic and vicar of the Holy Inquisition.

Works

References 

17th-century births
17th-century deaths
Italian astrological writers
17th-century Italian Roman Catholic theologians